"Animal I Have Become" is a song by Canadian rock band Three Days Grace. It was released on April 10, 2006, as the first single from their second studio album, One-X. The song was released digitally on April 18, 2006. The song spent seven weeks at No. 1 on the US Mainstream Rock Tracks chart and two weeks at No. 1 on the US Modern Rock Tracks chart. The song alongside "Riot" are used in the video game, WWE SmackDown vs. Raw 2007. It is the band's first single with their fourth member Barry Stock.

Background
Lead singer Adam Gontier has stated that while he was addicted to the painkiller OxyContin, he was abusive and angry and had no idea who he was anymore. He wrote "Animal I Have Become" while in rehab for his addiction. Gontier also added, "'Animal I Have Become' is my realization that change had to happen, I had to ask for help." The band wrote a demo version of the song in 2004 while on a bus in Germany. Bassist Brad Walst spoke to Billboard about the song stating, "I remember saying [that] that riff would be great heavy. As soon as we got back to North America, we started jamming it as a heavy song, and it was like, 'Shit, I think we’ve nailed it.'"

Versions
In late 2005, the band performed an alternate version of the song in concerts that featured a different set of lyrics. Both "Animal I Have Become" and "Pain" have been released in acoustic formats and are available on online music stores such as iTunes. Christian parody band ApologetiX recorded a parody of "Animal I Have Become", entitled "Animals I Have Begun" on their 2008 album, Future Tense.

Music video
The video, directed by Dean Karr, features singer Adam Gontier as the main character. The video starts with Gontier in his torn apart bedroom asleep. On top of him is a monstrous entity whom he tries to fight. He then gets up, gets dressed then starts walking through the streets of Downtown Toronto. He starts looking into mirrors, and other reflective objects, seeing himself as a monstrous entity once again with deathly eyes and a gaping hole with menacing teeth for a mouth twice, walking through various places, including a street where he pushes through everyone in front of him. It ends with his meeting a woman in a bar, only to find her looking just like the monster. He then gets frightened and yells, proceeding to overturn a table and throw a chair through a window. Gontier finds out it was all a dream, but his bedroom is seen in shambles as he looks around in wonder. During the video, clips of the band playing are featured. The video was released on April 24, 2006.

Accolades
In 2006, the song was Canada's most-played rock song and won that year's Mediabase award for the most-played rock song on radio. At the 2006 Billboard Music Awards, the song was nominated for "Modern Rock Single of the Year" and won the "Rock Single of the Year" award. The song received a BMI Award in 2006 along with their other single "Pain". The song was ranked at number 45 on Loudwire's "Top 21st Century Hard Rock Songs" in 2012. The song was also ranked on Billboard's "Greatest of All Time Mainstream Rock Songs" list at number 41.

Personnel
Adam Gontier – lead vocals, rhythm guitar 
Barry Stock – lead guitar
Brad Walst – bass guitar
Neil Sanderson – drums, backing vocals

Charts

Weekly charts

Year-end charts

All-time charts

Certifications

References

External links

2006 singles
2006 songs
Three Days Grace songs
Songs written by Adam Gontier
Songs written by Barry Stock
Jive Records singles
Songs about drugs
Songs about domestic violence
Songs about nightmares